Debut is the debut studio album by Austrian singer, songwriter, and actress Zoë (full name Zoë Straub). The album was released on 23 October 2015 through Global Rockstar Music.

Singles
"Quel filou" was released as the lead single from the album on 12 March 2015. It competed in Wer singt für Österreich? 2015, where it placed third. The song peaked at number 23 on the Ö3 Austria Top 40.
"Je m'en fous" was released as the album's second single on 26 June 2015.
"Mon cœur a trop aimé" was released as the album's third single on 31 July 2015. It peaked at number 12 on the Austrian Top 40 singles chart.
"Loin d'ici" was released as the album's fourth single on 5 February 2016. It won Wer singt für Österreich? 2016, and represented Austria in the Eurovision Song Contest 2016.

Track listing

Charts

Weekly charts

Year-end charts

Certifications

Release history

References

2015 debut albums
French-language albums
Zoë Straub albums